Imam Uddin Ahmed Chowdhury is a Bangladeshi retired career bureaucrat and former adviser, with the rank of minister, of Shahabuddin Ahmed caretaker government.

Career
Ahmed was an advisor in the Shahabuddin Ahmed caretaker government. He was in charge of the Ministry of Commerce.

References

Living people
Advisors of Caretaker Government of Bangladesh
University of Dhaka alumni
Year of birth missing (living people)